Güzelkent (literally "beautiful city" in Turkish) is a neighbourhood of Etimesgut district in Ankara, Turkey. It is located near the Eryaman neighbourhood, 25 km far from the city centre of Ankara, and is bordered by Eryaman, Sincan, Fatih and Etimesgut.

Even though the neighborhood is populated mostly by towers, the villas region is dominated by detached and semi-detached houses. Estimated population of Güzelkent is about 30,000.

The Ankara underground reaches the district and the Masal Dünyası (Fairy Tale Land) and Göksu Park Lake near the district.

Güzelkent photos

References

External links

Neighbourhoods of Etimesgut